The 2022 Men's AHF Cup was the sixth edition of the Men's AHF Cup, a field hockey qualification tournament for the Men's Hockey Asia Cup organized by the Asian Hockey Federation. The event was held at the GBK Hockey Field in Jakarta, Indonesia from 11 to 20 March 2022.

The top two teams qualified for the 2022 Men's Hockey Asia Cup.

Preliminary round

Pool A

Pool B

Fifth to eighth place classification

Bracket

5–8th place semi-finals

Seventh place game

Fifth place game

First to fourth place classification

Bracket

Semi-finals

Third place game

Final

Final standings

Goalscorers

See also
 2022 Men's Hockey Asia Cup
 Field hockey at the 2022 Asian Games – Men's Qualifier

References

Men's AHF Cup
AHF Cup
AHF Cup
AHF Cup
Sports competitions in Jakarta
2020s in Jakarta
International field hockey competitions hosted by Indonesia